The West Swanzey Covered Bridge (also known as the Thompson Bridge) is a historic wooden covered bridge carrying Main Street over the Ashuelot River in West Swanzey, New Hampshire.  Built in 1832, it is one of New Hampshire's few surviving 19th-century covered bridges.  Unlike most of those, it is prominently located in the village, providing access from the village center to New Hampshire Route 10.  The bridge was listed on the National Register of Historic Places in 1980.

Description and history

The West Swanzey Covered Bridge is located just west of the village center of West Swanzey, carrying Main Street over the Ashuelot River in a roughly east–west orientation.  It is one of two bridges in the village; the other is a modern one about  downriver.  It is a two-span Town lattice truss structure, 136'10" long, with spans measuring 64'0" and 63'6", and rests on a stone central pier and abutments. It is covered by a shallow-pitch metal gabled roof, which extends beyond the trusses to shelter sidewalks on both sides.  Only one of the sidewalks now survives, although evidence of the separate walkway portals survives.  The main vehicle portals have segmented-arch tops, which are echoed in the pedestrian portals.

The bridge was built in 1832 by Zadoc Taft for the town at a cost of $523.27. In 1973 the bridge was posted for a six-ton limit, requiring school buses to empty before they could cross the bridge.  It was closed to all traffic in 1990, and underwent a major reconstruction in 1993.

See also

List of New Hampshire covered bridges
List of bridges on the National Register of Historic Places in New Hampshire
National Register of Historic Places listings in Cheshire County, New Hampshire

References

Covered bridges on the National Register of Historic Places in New Hampshire
Wooden bridges in New Hampshire
Tourist attractions in Cheshire County, New Hampshire
Bridges in Cheshire County, New Hampshire
National Register of Historic Places in Cheshire County, New Hampshire
Swanzey, New Hampshire
Road bridges on the National Register of Historic Places in New Hampshire
Lattice truss bridges in the United States